Jumpsuit may refer to:
 Jumpsuit, a form-fitting garment which covers the whole body.
 A 1941 World War II U.S. Army two piece parachutist uniform designed by William P. Yarborough that was modified as the M-1942 jumpsuit.  It made a reappearance in 1963 as the Army tropical combat uniform, and later became the pattern of the US military Battle Dress Uniform.
 A term for any suit used at parachuting.
 Jumpsuit (band), an American rock band
"Jumpsuit" (song), a song by American rock band Twenty One Pilots' fifth album, Trench